Vegachí is a town and municipality in the Colombian department of Antioquia. Part of the subregion of Northeastern Antioquia.

Municipalities of Antioquia Department